Pass It Around may refer to:

 Pass It Around (Smokie album), 1975
 Pass It Around (song), a 1975 song by Smokie
 Pass It Around (Donavon Frankenreiter album), 2008